The Social Housing Services Corporation (SHSC) operated in the Province of Ontario, Canada to provide group services for social housing providers, non-profit housing and co-operative housing following the downloading of responsibility for over 270,000 social housing units to local municipalities. SHSC was a business corporation created under the Social Housing Reform Act of 2000. SHSC became operational in February 2002.
The 15 member SHSC board was made up of provincial, municipal, non-profit and co-op housing representatives. Its mandate was to provide Ontario housing providers and service managers with bulk purchasing, insurance, investment and training programs.

History 
In 1997, the Government of Ontario announced that social housing programs (public housing, non-profit housing and rent supplement programs) administered by the province would be devolved to the municipal level under an initiative called Local Services Realignment.
For a decade, the SHSC, offered a dedicated insurance program for social housing providers, bulk gas purchasing and an innovative energy efficiency retrofit program which coordinated energy audits, expertise, funding, bulk purchasing of energy-efficient goods, training and education, and data evaluation through its three subsidiaries—SOHO Tenant Insurance, SHSC Financial Inc. and GLOBE (Green Light on a Better Environment).

In 2000, the province passed legislation to devolve social housing to the municipal level. This legislation, the [Social Housing Reform Act, 2000], established the Social Housing Services Corporation to administer certain programs province-wide on behalf of service managers and social housing providers.

The SHRA 2000 was replaced by the Housing Services Act, 2011 which took full effect in December 2012. The Act essentially gave service managers more flexibility to manage locally and to build new affordable housing. 
The changes in the HSA regarding SHSC appeared subtle. The HSA (2011) created the Housing Services Corporation .

The key differences between the two organizations other than the staff change is in the oversight by the Province of Ontario through Accountability Regulations. The HSC is generally assumed to be an 'Agency of the Province'. In 2013 the Province allowed HSC to sell sixty percent of the investment arm (SHSCFI) to British Columbia Coops and the BC government. SHSCFI was wound down and anew board created called ENCASA. The bulk of the HSC operating revenue comes from the administration fee for bulk purchasing of Gas for 42 Local Housing Corporations. .

SHSC managed and provided investment advice to housing providers on capital reserves valued at more than $390 million. Working closely with other housing sector organizations and non-governmental organizations, SHSC also supported and developed independent housing-related research. The Social Housing Services Corporation was created in January 2002 and officially began its mandate on May 1, 2002. SHSC was created as an independent corporation under the Social Housing Reform Act, 2000 to provide housing-related services for municipal service managers and social housing providers across Ontario. The Social Housing Reform Act, 2000 was repealed in 2012.

Subsidiaries

SHSC Financial Inc.

SHSC Financial Inc.(SHSC FI) managed Ontario's Social Housing Investment Program. In October 2014, SHSC Financial expanded its ownership and became Encasa.

SoHo Insurance Inc.
SoHo Insurance Inc. was an insurance brokerage created in late 2005 to develop insurance products specifically designed to address the needs of Ontario’s social housing community. In early 2008, SoHo launched its tenant insurance program – a low-cost insurance option for residents of social housing.

SoHo Insurance Inc. was led by a board of directors made up of representatives from the social housing sector including municipalities, non profit housing, District Social Services Administration Boards and cooperative housing.

In 2014 SoHo was renamed HSC Insurance Inc.. It subsequently completed the transfer of its broker functions relating to tenant insurance to Marsh Canada. HSC Insurance Inc. is a RIBO-licensed broker that collects premiums from the prescribed social housing providers and acts as sub-broker for the mandated insurance program. It also manages claims to HSC's mandated insurance program’s Property Claims Trust Fund on behalf of HSC and acts as an administrator to provide tenant insurance for residents of social housing.

GLOBE (Green Light on a Better Environment)
In 2005, SHSC began to investigate the impact of rising utility costs and the opportunities to assist the affordable housing sector in responding to the challenges. SHSC was able to bring attention to the sector and garner support from government agencies and utility companies to establish a pilot program – the Green Light Initiative. The Pilot program demonstrated a clear need in the sector and the willingness of housing providers and service managers to invest in conservation.

As a result, SHSC launched a full provincial roll-out called GLOBE (Green Light on a Better Environment). A subsidiary of SHSC, GLOBE connects social housing providers, municipal service managers, property managers, and social housing tenants with the tools and services to help them make smart choices about energy and water use. GLOBE developed and administered energy management programs for the social housing sector.

Most of GLOBE’s program/service offerings were transferred to HSC Energy Services in 2014 and the company was dissolved in 2015.

See also
 Affordable housing
 Public housing
 Economic impact of immigration to Canada
 Poverty in Canada
 Energy conservation
 Energy
 Housing

References

External links
 Housing Services Corporation

Organizations based in Ontario